This article lists the results for the Northern Ireland national under-21 football team from 2020 to the present day.

2020s

2020

2021

2022

References

External links
Irish Football Association
Northern Ireland U-21 at Soccerway
Northern Ireland Under-21 International Matches
Northern Ireland U21 at World Football
Northern Ireland - Under-21 - UEFA.com

Northern Ireland national under-21 football team